The Golden Goose Award is a United States award in recognition of scientists whose federally funded basic research has led to innovations or inventions with significant impact on humanity or society. Created by Congressman Jim Cooper of Tennessee in 2012, recipients receive the award in a ceremony during the fall each year on Capitol Hill in Washington D.C.

Background
Between 1975 and 1988, William Proxmire, a Democratic United States Senator for Wisconsin awarded the tongue-in-cheek Golden Fleece Awards to public officials for squandering public money. These awards were often given to scientists working on seemingly obscure studies that were federally-funded, causing ridicule and scrutiny of the usefulness of such research. 

The Golden Goose Awards were established over two decades later in order to highlight the value of federally-funded basic research. With the Golden Goose Award, Cooper wanted to reverse the image created by Proxmire's award by highlighting examples of seemingly obscure studies that have led to major breakthroughs and resulted in significant societal impact.  The award has bipartisan support in Congress and is sponsored by a number of notable organizations and legislators.

Awardees

Founding organizations
Some of the founding organizations for this award are the American Association for the Advancement of Science (AAAS), the Association of American Universities (AAU), the Association of Public and Land-grant Universities (A۰P۰L۰U), the Breakthrough Institute, the Progressive Policy Institute (PPI), and The Science Coalition (TSC)

References

External links
 
 Golden Goose Awards honor "silly" science. CBS News. September 14, 2012.
 First Golden Goose Awards Honor Ideas That Hatched Unexpectedly. Science Insider. Science. September 10, 2012.

Invention awards
Award ceremonies
Science and technology awards